The Fairfield Carnegie Library is a historic building in Fairfield, Nebraska, and a Carnegie library. It was built in 1913 by T. J. Fowler with 6,000 from the Carnegie Corporation of New York. It was designed in Prairie School style by architect R. W. Grant. It has been listed on the National Register of Historic Places since November 29, 2001.

References

National Register of Historic Places in Clay County, Nebraska
Library buildings completed in 1913
Carnegie libraries in Nebraska
Prairie School architecture in Nebraska